The Visita de Calamajué was a Catholic visita located in the indigenous Cochimí settlement of Calamajué in Baja California, Mexico. The visita was founded by Jesuit missionaries Ferdinand Konščak and Wenceslaus Linck in October 1766 as an extension of Misión San Francisco Borja.

History

About 90 kilometers north of San Borja, Calamajué was found by the Jesuit missionary-explorer Ferdinand Konščak in 1751 and revisited in 1766 by Wenceslaus Linck. It was intended to become the site of Mission Santa María.

In October 1766, the Jesuits founded their 17th mission here. In just a few months, the crops failed due to the highly mineralized water available. However, a more suitable site for the mission was found about 50 kilometers farther north, at Cabujakaamung, following seven months of mission activity at Calamajué.

Calamajué also served as a estancia along El Camino Real Misionero between Misión San Francisco Borja and Misión Santa María de los Ángeles.

Preservation
Today, a complex of adobe ruins and rock corrals are all that remain of the original visita.

See also

 Spanish missions in Baja California
 List of Jesuit sites

References
 Vernon, Edward W. 2002. Las Misiones Antiguas: The Spanish Missions of Baja California, 1683–1855. Viejo Press, Santa Barbara, California.
 Kier, David. 2016. Baja California Land of Missions
M&E BOOKS, El Cajon, California.

Missions in Baja California Sur
Landmarks in Ensenada
1766 establishments in New Spain